Nowra Sandstone occurs in the Sydney Basin in eastern Australia. Formed in the Late Permian, the rock stratum is up to 90 metres thick. The popular bushwalking areas of Pigeon House Mountain and the Budawangs feature this rock type.

Gallery

See also 
 Sydney Basin

References 

Geologic formations of Australia
Permian System of Australia
Sandstone formations
Geology of New South Wales